Chhatrapati Shivaji Maharaj Terminus (previously Chhatrapati Shivaji Terminus, Mumbai station code: CSMT (mainline)/ST (suburban), is a historic railway terminus and UNESCO World Heritage Site in Mumbai, Maharashtra, India.

The terminus was designed by a British born architectural engineer Frederick William Stevens from an initial design by Axel Haig, in an exuberant Italian Gothic style. Its construction began in 1878, in a location south of the old Bori Bunder railway station, and was completed in 1887, the year marking 50 years of Queen Victoria's rule.

In March 1996 the station name was changed from Victoria Terminus to "Chhatrapati Shivaji Terminus" (with station code CST) after Chhatrapati Shivaji Maharaj, the 17th-century warrior king who employed guerrilla tactics to contest the Mughal Empire and found a new state in the western Marathi-speaking regions of the Deccan Plateau.

In 2017, the station was again renamed "Chhatrapati Shivaji Maharaj Terminus" (with code CSMT), where the title Maharaj has literal meaning, "Great king; emperor."  Both former initials "VT" and the current, "CST", are also commonly used.

The terminus is the headquarters of India's Central Railway. It is one of the busiest railway stations in India, serving as a terminal for both long-distance and suburban trains with a total number of 18 platforms.

History

Victoria Terminus 
This famous landmark which has become a symbol of the city, was built as the headquarters of the Great Indian Peninsular Railway.

The railway station was built to replace the Bori Bunder railway station, in the Bori Bunder area of Mumbai, a prominent port and warehouse area known for its imports and exports. Since Mumbai became a major port city at the time, a bigger station was built to meet its demands, and was named Victoria Terminus, after the then reigning Empress of India, Victoria. The station was designed by Frederick William Stevens, a British born engineer architect, attached to the Bombay office of the Indian colonial Public Works Department. Work began in 1878. He received  as the payment for his services. Stevens earned the commission to construct the station after a masterpiece watercolour sketch by draughtsman Axel Haig. The design has been compared to George Gilbert Scott's 1873 St Pancras railway station in London, also in an exuberant Italian Gothic style, but it is far closer to Scott's second prize winning entry for Berlin's parliament building, exhibited in London in 1875, which featured numerous towers and turrets, and a large central ribbed dome. The style of the station is also similar to other public buildings of the 1870s in Mumbai, such as the Elphinstone College but especially the buildings of Mumbai University, also designed by G Scott.

The station took ten years to complete, the longest for any building of that era in Mumbai.

Missing statue 

During its construction, a marble statue of Queen Victoria was installed in the main façade of the building, in a canopy under the clock. In the 1950s, authorities had begun to remove statues of the British figures from government buildings and public spaces based on a directive from the Government of India. Most of the statues, including that of Queen Victoria, were sent to Victoria Gardens (later renamed Rani Baug) where they were left lying on the grass in the open until at least the 1980s. A Right to Information report was filed, but had no records of the missing statue being exported out of India. Historians now believe that the statue was smuggled out, sold by politicians, or destroyed. The symbol of Progress, another statue, featured on the top of the dome, is often mistaken for that of Queen Victoria.

Renaming 

The station has been renamed several times. It was built to replace Bori Bunder, the terminus of the Great Indian Peninsula Railway from 1853 to 1888, and was named Victoria Terminus to commemorate the Golden Jubilee of Queen Victoria. In 1996, the station was renamed to Chhatrapati Shivaji Terminus in honour of Emperor Chhatrapati Shivaji, founder of the Maratha Empire.

In December 2016, the Fadnavis Ministry passed a resolution to change the name to Chhatrapati Shivaji Maharaj Terminus in the Maharashtra Assembly and in May 2017, the home ministry officially sent a letter to the state government denoting the name change, following which the station was yet again renamed as the Chhatrapati Shivaji Maharaj Terminus. However, both the former names "VT" as well as "CST" along with the current name "CSMT" are popularly used.

2008 Mumbai attacks 

On 26 November 2008, two terrorists entered the passenger hall of the CST, opened fire and threw grenades at people. The terrorists were armed with AK-47 rifles.
One of the terrorists, Ajmal Kasab, was later caught alive by the police and identified by eyewitnesses. The others did not survive. The attacks began around 21:30 when the two men entered the passenger hall and opened fire, The attackers killed 58 people and injured 104 others, their assault ending at about 22:45 after they exited the station via the North FOB towards the west to Cama hospital back entrance. The CCTV evidence was used to identify and indict Kasab. In 2010, Kasab was sentenced to death for his role in the attack, and in 2012 he was hanged.

Structure 

The station building is designed in the High Victorian Gothic style of architecture. The building exhibits a fusion of influences from Victorian Italianate Gothic Revival architecture and classical Indian architecture. The skyline, turrets, pointed arches, and eccentric ground plan are close to classical Indian palace architecture. Externally, the wood carving, tiles, ornamental iron and brass railings, grills for the ticket offices, the balustrades for the grand staircases and other ornaments were the work of students at the Sir Jamsetjee Jeejebhoy School of Art. The station stands as an example of 19th-century railway architectural marvels for its advanced structural and technical solutions. The CSMT was constructed using a high level of engineering both in terms of railway and civil engineering. It is one of the first and finest products of the use of industrial technology, merged with the Gothic Revival style in India. The centrally domed office structure has a 330-foot-long platform connected to a 1,200-foot-long train shed, and its outline provides the skeleton plan for the building. CSMT's dome of dovetailed ribs, built without centering, was considered as a novel achievement of the era.

The interior of the building was conceived as a series of large rooms with high ceilings. It is a utilitarian building and has had various changes required by the users, not always sympathetic. It has a C-shaped plan which is symmetrical on an east–west axis. All the sides of the building are given equal value in the design. It is crowned by a high central dome, which acts as the focal point. The dome is an octagonal ribbed structure with a colossal female figure symbolizing Progress, holding a torch pointing upwards in her right hand and a spoked wheel in her left hand. The side wings enclose the courtyard, which opens on to the street. The wings are anchored by monumental turrets at each of their four corners, which balance and frame the central dome. The façades present the appearance of well-proportioned rows of windows and arches. The ornamentation in the form of statuary, bas-reliefs, and friezes is exuberant yet well controlled. The columns of the entrance gates are crowned by figures of a lion (representing Great Britain) and a tiger (representing India). The main structure is built from a blend of India sandstone and limestone, while high-quality Italian marble was used for the key decorative elements. The main interiors are also decorated: the ground floor of the North Wing, known as the Star Chamber, which is still used as the booking office, is embellished with Italian marble and polished Indian blue stone. The stone arches are covered with carved foliage and grotesques. Internally, the ceiling of the booking hall was originally painted blue, gold and strong red on a ground of rich blue with gold stars. Its walls were lined with glazed tiles made by Maw & Co of Britain. Outside, there are statues representing Commerce, Agriculture, Engineering and Science, with a statue representing Progress on the central dome of the station.

Platforms 
CSMT has a total of 18 platforms—seven platforms are for suburban EMU trains and eleven platforms (Platform 8 to Platform 18) are for long-distance trains. Rajdhani, Duronto, Garib Rath and Tejas Express leave from Platform No. 18. Air-conditioned dormitories were inaugurated at CST on 16 April 2013. The facility has 58 beds for men and 20 for women.

In popular culture 

 The station has been the location of filming the "Jai Ho" song in Slumdog Millionaire; and the 2011 Indian film Ra.One.

See also 

 Timeline of Mumbai

References

External links 

 Chhatrapati Shivaji Terminus on the UNESCO website
 Chhatrapati Shivaji Terminus Mumbai
 Google Satellite Map of Mumbai CST

Railway terminus in India

Mumbai Suburban Railway stations
Tourist attractions in Mumbai
Railway stations in India opened in 1888
Railway stations in Mumbai City district
Gothic Revival architecture in India
Domes
World Heritage Sites in Maharashtra
Rebuilt buildings and structures in India
Monuments and memorials to Shivaji
Chhatrapati Shivaji Terminus
World Heritage Sites in India
Italianate architecture in India
2008 Mumbai attacks
Indian Railway A1 Category Stations